The Austin Peay Governors are the intercollegiate athletic teams of Austin Peay State University (APSU), located in Clarksville, Tennessee, United States. The Governors athletic program is a member of the ASUN Conference. Prior to 2022 the Governors were members of the Ohio Valley Conference (OVC) and competes at the NCAA Division I level including the Football Championship Subdivision. The Austin Peay mascot is The Governor, and the school colors are red and white. While the women's teams were formerly known as the Lady Govs, the school emphasizes that all teams are now Governors.

Sports sponsored

Athletics began at Austin Peay almost as soon as the school opened for classes in 1929 as Austin Peay Normal School; men's and women's basketball teams were organized that first year. Football was added in the fall of 1930 and baseball in the spring of 1931, with other men's sports added and dropped over the years. Women's basketball was discontinued in 1938, but returned  in 1973, along with volleyball, tennis, and golf when women's sports gained widespread inclusion.

A member of the Ohio Valley Conference, Austin Peay State University sponsors teams in six men's, and ten women's NCAA sanctioned sports.

On September 17, 2021, the ASUN Conference and Austin Peay announced that all sports teams will be moving to the ASUN Conference on July 1, 2022.

Facilities

 Basketball: Winfield Dunn Center
 The basketball teams will move off campus to the new F&M Bank Arena, currently under construction in downtown Clarksville, in the 2023–24 season. Construction delays postponed this move from its original 2022 schedule.
 Baseball: Raymond C. Hand Park
 Cross country: (Does not have home competition facility)
 Football: Fortera Stadium
 Golf: Swan Lake Golf Course, Clarksville Country Club & The Links at Novadell

 Soccer: Morgan Brothers Soccer Field
 Softball: Cheryl Holt Field
 Tennis: Governors Indoor Tennis Center & Outdoor Tennis Courts
 Track and field (indoor): (Does not have home competition facility)
 Track and field (outdoor): Fortera Stadium
 Volleyball: Winfield Dunn Center

References

External links